The Women's 4 × 400 metres relay event at the 2011 World Championships in Athletics was held at the Daegu Stadium on 2 and 3 September.  Friday and Saturday.  This is a change in schedule from previous years when all the relays were at the end of the program.  This might necessitate a change in strategy to allow for team members involved in other events.

The United States held the two fastest relay times before the championships and had won the 2007 and 2009 world titles, as well as the 2008 Olympic gold medals. Jamaica and Russia – the only other nations to have won a world title since 2000 – were the other primary contenders. A Brazilian team had broken the South American record a month before the championships and was the third fastest qualifying nation. Great Britain, Ukraine and Germany comprised the other major nations at the competition.

Twenty teams, instead of the normal sixteen, started this event, necessitating three heats instead of two.  United States was an easy winner in heat one, with Ukraine edging out neighboring Belarus for the second automatic qualifying spot, but Belarus qualified on time.  Russia, with the fastest time, was an easy winner in heat two with Nigeria taking the second automatic spot and Czech Republic taking the second time qualifier.  Jamaica and Great Britain separated cleanly from their competitors in heat three.

In the final, the United States led off with previous world champion Sanya Richards-Ross, who handed off to silver medalist Allyson Felix in the lead.  Felix extended the lead with Russian Natalya Antyukh and then Jamaica 's Davita Prendergast chasing about 5 metres back.  Prendergast passed a fading Antyukh, who had charged after Felix and was slowing, just before the handoff.  Novlene Williams-Mills solidified Jamaica's hold on second place during the third leg.  On the anchor leg, Francena McCorory burst away from the handoff, extending the lead to 10 metres and discouraging a challenge.  McCorory paid for that burst on the home stretch, but still maintained the 5 metre lead at the finish.  Jamaica knocked a second off their National record.

On 21 June 2017, Russia forfeited the bronze medal following the disqualification of Kapachinskaya. The medal was reallocated by IAAF to Great Britain.

Medalists

Records

Qualification standards

Schedule

Results

Heats 
Qualification: First 2 of each heat (Q) plus the 2 fastest times (q) advance to the final.

Final 

1 Positive drug test of Kapachinskaya
2 Positive drug test of Yefremova

References

External links 
 Relay results at IAAF website

Relay 4 x 400
Relays at the World Athletics Championships
2011 in women's athletics